In the House is an American television sitcom that originally aired on NBC from April 10, 1995 and moved to UPN after its second season. The show starred LL Cool J as Marion Hill a former professional football player with the Oakland Raiders. Because of his financial predicament, he is forced to rent out most of the rooms in his house to newly divorced single mother Jackie Warren (Debbie Allen) and her two children, Tiffany (Maia Campbell) and Austin (Jeffery Wood). In the third season, Jackie and Austin move to Nashville, leaving Tiffany to stay with Marion in order to finish school in Los Angeles; Marion purchases a sports rehabilitation facility with the boisterous Tonia (Kim Wayans) and the pompous Maxwell (Alfonso Ribeiro), leading to the trio's attempts to work together despite their clashing personalities.

Series overview

Episodes

Season 1 (1995)

Season 2 (1995–96)

Season 3 (1996–97)

Season 4 (1997–98)

Season 5 (1999)

References

External links

 
 

In the House